H. Salt Esq. Fish & Chips was a restaurant chain specializing in British-style fish and chips, founded by Haddon Salt in Sausalito, California in 1965. Salt followed his father and grandfather in becoming a master fish cook and entrepreneur.

Salt's business was acquired by the Kentucky Fried Chicken corporation in 1969. The sale made Salt the third largest stockholder in KFC, at the time the world's largest fast-food company.

KFC was not successful in the large-scale expansion of the H.Salt Esq. chain and cut its ties to the brand and business in 1987. Each franchisee was allowed to purchase their restaurant. A few independently owned H. Salt Esq. restaurants are still up and running around California.

History 

"I decided to bring the business here because all the tourists told me if they had fish and chips in America like I cooked them, I'd have a great business". Salt opened "Salt's English Fish & Chips Shop" in Sausalito, California in 1965.

Salt's wife Grace managed their first fish and chips shop in Sausalito while Salt opened another store in Berkeley. It was reported the Salts planned "to establish a number of franchised shops in various locations throughout the Bay Area and perhaps even more extensively". By 1966, the Sausalito store was selling fish and chips in a checked paper basket and encouraging customers to "eat fish as you walk along... very common in England".

By 1967, Salt owned two more fish and chip stores, one in Sunnyvale and one in Santa Cruz. They were now named "H.Salt, Esq. Authentic English Fish and Chips Shoppe".

Naming the brand 

When Salt decided to start franchising his fish and chips stores, marketing advisers suggested he use "a real English name such as 'British' or 'London', or 'Picadilly' or 'Old English'" to name his brand. He disagreed, saying:

KFC entered a joint venture with H.Salt in 1969. It sold off the chain in 1980.

Equipment 

Salt was the sole United States and Canadian sales agent for Henry Nuttall fish and chip frying ranges and related equipment. Salt specified Nuttall equipment for his franchised fish and chip stores. Salt often referred to the brand during news interviews, saying:

The Nuttall ranges used by Salt were 18 feet long and had glass fronts so patrons could watch their orders being cooked. Salt said the ranges were "the heart of the operation".

"English" store design 

Salt wanted his stores to remind American customers of England but made concessions in their design.

Service personnel behind the glass windowed store fryer counters wore uniforms that reminded customers of traditional British street vendorsred or white aprons, white caps, and vintage white maid's caps.

Insistence on providing customers with both quality food and experience 

Salt understood he was dealing with potential American customers who had little experience with fish and chips. He knew he had to offer the highest quality product and experience to convert the public. He said he "must be frank in stating that there might be a wait for an order simply because we fry on request to assure the product is piping hot which is the only way to enjoy fish and chips". Customer service was important to Salt as well. "We impress upon our proprietors the importance of genuinely caring for the interests of our customers".

Sale of H. Salt Esq. Fish & Chips to KFC 

Salt discussed the reasons and process involved in his 1968 decision to sell his business to KFC in The New York Times film documentary The King of Fish and Chips:

When the deal was consummated, KFC said they planned to have 1,000 combined company-owned and franchised H.Salt Fish & Chips stores by 1973. KFC newspaper ads offered franchise opportunities, saying:

In the copy, Salt claimed, "I'll do for English fish and chips what the colonel did for chicken". Salt would "continue as president of the company, which will be a Kentucky Fried Chicken subsidiary" and "will perform a publicity role like other corporate figureheads".

Aggressive franchise program begins, abruptly stops, restarts 

KFC immediately started to change Salt's business model, The company began a series of confusing and contradictory changes to the fish and chips franchise operation, promoting franchises priced 450 percent higher than those sold by Salt, then abruptly buying back those franchises and just as quickly restarting a different franchise format.

KFC promotes H. Salt Esq. Fish & Chips franchise opportunities 

In 1969, KFC heavily promoted H. Salt Esq. franchise opportunities in newspaper and magazine print ads. Comparing KFC's having built 2,400 units since 1957, the company claimed they had "invested capital in opening and operating over 400 [H. Salt Esq.] units in 18 markets". The ads promised franchisees would receive "the proven ingredients they need for profitable operation" with "management and operational guidance by the world's most experienced franchise operators, exclusive fish-fry equipment, a quality-controlled source of Icelandic fillets, secret batter ingredients, and expert training to make your employees master fish fryers". Current and former KFC franchisees were given "first crack" at purchasing H. Salt Esq. franchises.

KFC increased franchise fees by 450% 

KFC increased the fee to franchise an H.Salt Esq. Fish & Chips store from $20,000 to $90,000. The first store to open under the terms of the new agreement was in Louisville, Kentucky. When an H. Salt Esq. store opened in Dayton, Ohio in November 1969, the store saw a first-day total of 2,300 orders of fish and chips.

Changes to store format and menu 

In 1970 the footprint of new H.Salt Esq. stores were expanded to include 34 seats. "We found that a lot of people like to sit down to eat, rather than carry out, so we will be taking this approach in the new units".

In 1971, KFC pared back additions to the H.Salt fish and chips menu. Salt said, "We tried shrimp... but it spoiled the taste of the fish". After Salt left the company in 1972, KFC once again added shrimp and other seafood to the H. Salt Fish & Chips menu.

Corporate buy-back of existing franchises 

KFC quickly started a buy-back program of franchised H.Salt Esq. stores in late 1969, quickly purchasing previously franchised units. By November 1969, KFC owned 464 H.Salt Esq. outlets.

Franchises once again offered 

One year later, KFC recommenced offering franchises for existing and new H.Salt Esq. locations. Salt was quoted as preferring franchised operations over the company store model. "The franchisee does a better job... We made a mistake with so many company stores, but that is changed".

KFC acquired by Heublein 

In July 1971, KFC president John Y. Brown Jr. sold the company to the Connecticut-based Heublein, a packaged food and liquor corporation, for million. The business model moving forward called for the closing or franchising of 168 H.Salt Esq. outlets. Salt's contract as "chairman of the fish and chips division" would be assumed by Hueblein according to the sale agreement.

Erratic refinement of the H. Salt concept by Heublein/KFC

Contaminated raw fish 

In 1972, an H. Salt, Esq. customer in Minneapolis complained of worms in his serving of fried fish. A local sanitarian examined 500 individual servings for "worms...  to 2 inches long... thick as a heavy thread... usually found coiled." 17 pieces of fish were removed and the outlet was ordered not to accept any more fish from the New Jersey supplier. The H. Salt area director said the fish, caught and packed by a fishery in Nova Scotia, Canada "came from a supplier not normally used by the company". The contaminated fish had been ordered by KFC's procurement division, not through H.Salt, Esq.'s normal Icelandic supply chain.

Larger "Seafood Galley" store format 

KFC did not enforce Haddon Salt's narrow focus on perfect fish and chips with franchisees. In January 1972, Dolph Brown, who owned four franchised H.Salt, Esq. locations in Knoxville, Tennessee, created "Dolph Brown's Seafood Galley", a menu that featured over 30 "fresh and breaded seafood dishes" as additional items. His additions included the "Boatload of Fresh 'Tennessee Fried' Channel catfish", oysters, scallops, fresh "miniature lobster tails", rainbow trout, trout almondine, crab rolls, deviled crab, halibut steak, stuffed shrimp, red snapper, Bavarian beef burger, Bavarian pork cutlet sandwich", an "Old English" fish sandwich and a filet of Florida flounder dinner (with fries, hushpuppies and cole slaw). By June 1972, Brown had abandoned the H.Salt Esq. format and renamed his five stores "Dolph Brown's Big3 Self-Service Restaurants", offering "crispy chicken", "giant steakburgers" and the "seafood galley" which now included "oyster and shrimp cocktails".

In 1973, moving further away from the H.Salt, Esq. fish and chips format, KFC began developing a corporate "H.Salt Seafood Galley" concept, opening a test store in Pittsburgh, Pennsylvania. The new concept was described as "quick-service restaurants specializing in H.Salt Fish & Chips and a variety of other seafood". The new stores were larger at 2,400 square feet, offering seating for 90 diners as well as takeout.

By the summer of 1975, KFC was operating eight test galleys and started to sell franchises for the galley-style restaurant. In 1976, KFC sold 150 H.Salt Seafood Galley franchises.

Menu expanded beyond original "fish and chips" concept 

KFC changed the brand's marketing slogan to "Because you know your fish, shrimp, clams, scallops!" The menu included fried oysters and "seafood cakes", batter-fried vegetables, mushrooms and hushpuppies. Battered, fried shrimp and pineapple chunks on skewers, boiled shrimp, and shrimp salads were also heavily promoted.

KFC continued to move away from a focused fish and chips concept, adding many different menu items. In 1976, "finger steaks", batter-fried strips of beef served with cole slaw, onion rings, and chips were added to the menu. In 1977, KFC dropped the word "chips" from H.Salt Seafood Galley advertising, instead calling them "fries". Print advertising started to mention "light, fluffy rolls" as part of the menu.

The "Fish-Ka-Bob" 

In 1977, KFC developed the "Fish-Ka-Bob", a new menu item that featured "chunks of tender fish, sweet onion, green pepper, luscious, juicy pineapple" all dipped in a "mouth-watering batter", fried and served on a wood skewer. It was described as "the most delightful new seafood taste you've ever known".

KFC sells "H. Salt" properties 

In 1980, then KFC CEO Michael A. Miles sold the H.Salt Seafood Galley restaurants owned by KFC as part of his "back-to-basics" program aimed to redefine and rebuild the faltering Kentucky Fried Chicken brand.

In 1987, KFC cut all ties to the H.Salt brand, turning over the 70 remaining franchised stores in California to the 60 west coast franchisees.

See also 

 List of seafood restaurants

References

External links 
 Official site
 Almost Famous: The King of Fish and Chips

1965 establishments in California
Fast-food chains of the United States
Fast-food seafood restaurants
Fish and chip restaurants
Regional restaurant chains in the United States
Restaurants established in 1965